Heliconia tandayapensis is a species of plant in the family Heliconiaceae. It is endemic to Ecuador.

References

Flora of Ecuador
tandayapensis